Pleasureville is a suburban unincorporated community and census-designated place (CDP) in York County, Pennsylvania, United States. It was first listed as a CDP prior to the 2020 census.

It is bordered to the northwest by Codorus Creek, a northeast-flowing tributary of the Susquehanna River. Manchester Township is to the northwest across Codorus Creek.

The center of the community comprises the Pleasureville Historic District, listed on the National Register of Historic Places.

Demographics

References 

Census-designated places in York County, Pennsylvania
Census-designated places in Pennsylvania